Muhammad Azwan bin Aripin (born 21 April 1996) is a Malaysian footballer who plays as a left-back or wing-back for Malaysia Super League club Sri Pahang.

Azwan began his career with Kelantan's youth team in 2014 before being promoted to first team in August 2016. Azwan was the captain for the Kelantan U19 that won the Malaysia Youth League title in 2014. He also was part of the Kelantan U21 team that won the President's Cup in 2016.

Club career

Kelantan
On 28 October 2017, Azwan made his debut for Kelantan in a 1–3 win over Melaka United in a league last match. On 11 November 2017, it was announced that Azwan will be retained for another season with Kelantan. For 2018 season, Azwan made his season first appearance in 1–1 draw against Terengganu on 6 February 2018.

Penang
Azwan joined newly promoted club Penang in December 2020. He made his league first appearance in 2–0 defeat to Johor Darul Ta'zim on 9 March 2021.

Career statistics

Club

Honours

Club
Kelantan U19
Malaysia Youth League: 2014

Kelantan U21
Malaysia President Cup: 2016

References

External links
 

1996 births
Living people
Kelantan F.C. players
Penang F.C. players
Sri Pahang FC players
Malaysian footballers
Malaysian people of Malay descent
People from Kelantan
Association football defenders
Malaysia Super League players